Eduardo do Nascimento Souza (born 1 January 1980), known as Eduardo Souza or Dorita, is a Brazilian football coach.

Career
Born in Votuporanga, São Paulo, Souza played youth football as a central defender for Santos and Rio Branco-SP's youth categories before retiring at the age of 19. After graduating in Physical Education at the State University of Londrina in 2002, he started to work at Londrina's youth setup as a fitness coach, and was later promoted to the first team.

Souza then went on to work with Roberto Fonseca, always as a fitness coach. In December 2013, he joined CRB as Roberval Davino's assistant, and became the club's interim coach the following March after Davino's dismissal.

On 27 March 2014, Souza was confirmed as CRB head coach, but resigned on 18 May. He then joined Doriva's staff as his assistant at Ituano, Atlético Paranaense, Vasco da Gama, Ponte Preta (two stints), São Paulo, Bahia, Santa Cruz, Atlético Goianiense, Novorizontino and again CRB.

On 9 December 2018, Souza was named head coach of Votuporanguense, but was sacked the following 12 February after only seven matches. He subsequently returned to Atlético Goianiense as a permanent assistant coach of the main squad; in October, he was interim coach for one match (a 0–0 home draw against Ponte Preta) before the signing of Eduardo Barroca.

After the dismissal of Cristóvão Borges in February 2020, Souza was again named interim of Dragão until the appointment of Vagner Mancini. He was also an interim in one further occasion, between the tenures of Mancini and Marcelo Cabo, before leaving the club on 3 March 2021 due to personal reasons.

In April 2021, Souza returned to Dragão, and was again named interim in May after Jorginho resigned. He became an interim again on 7 February 2022, after Cabo left, but he himself left the club fourteen days later, stating a "desire to become a full-time head coach".

On 9 March 2022, Souza replaced Thiago Carvalho at the helm of Série C side Aparecidense. He was himself dismissed on 6 June, with the club nearing the relegation zone.

Souza returned to Atlético on 28 August 2022, as an assistant of Eduardo Baptista, but was named interim coach on 29 September. On 13 November, despite the club's relegation, he was confirmed as manager for the upcoming season.

On 3 March 2023, despite having nine wins in 13 matches during the season, Souza was sacked by Atlético.

Coaching statistics

Notes

References

External links
Atlético Goianiense profile 

1980 births
Living people
Footballers from São Paulo (state)
Brazilian football managers
Campeonato Brasileiro Série A managers
Campeonato Brasileiro Série B managers
Campeonato Brasileiro Série C managers
Clube de Regatas Brasil managers
Atlético Clube Goianiense managers
Associação Atlética Aparecidense managers